The following is an incomplete list of the songs known to have been recorded and/or performed by P. Leela.

Malayalam Discography

1940s

1950s

1960s

1970s

1980s

1990s

Tamil discography

1940s

1950s

1960s

1970s

1980s

1990s

Kannada songs

1950s

1960s

1970s

Telugu songs

1940s

1950s

1960s

1970s

References

Lists of songs recorded by Indian singers